WQNR (99.9 FM, "99.9 Kate FM") is a radio station broadcasting a variety hits format. Licensed to Tallassee, Alabama, United States, the station serves the Auburn, Alabama, area.  The station is currently owned by Tiger Communications, Inc.

The station was assigned the WQNR call letters by the Federal Communications Commission on July 29, 1999.

The station is an affiliate of the syndicated Pink Floyd program "Floydian Slip."

Programming
The station has been previously known as "99.9 The Rock" with an adult album alternative music format. On April 14, 2008, the station was rebranded as "99.9 Kate FM" with a variety hits format.

Awards and honors
In 2004, 2005, 2006, and 2007 WQNR, as 99.9 'The Rock', was recognized as "College Station of the Year" by New Music Weekly Magazine at the New Music Awards.

References

External links

QNR
Adult hits radio stations in the United States
Radio stations established in 1992
1992 establishments in Alabama